Upland Britain refers to a semi-natural habitat of the British Isles, generally above , including:
Brecon Beacons, in southern Wales
Black Mountains, in southern Wales
Cambrian Mountains, in mid Wales
Snowdonia, in northern Wales
Dartmoor, in southwestern England
Exmoor, in southwestern England
Pennines, in northern England
North York Moors, in northern England
Northwest Highlands
Grampian Mountains
Southern Uplands, in southern Scotland

See also

Notes

Geography of Great Britain